The following is a list of rulers of the Kingdom of Gomma. Gomma was one of the monarchies  in the Gibe region of Ethiopia that emerged in the 18th century.

List of rulers of the Gibe kingdom of Gomma

Source: C. F. Beckingham and G. W. B. Huntingford, Some Records of Ethiopia, 1593-1646 (London: Hakluyt Society, 1954), p. lxxxix

See also
Monarchies of Ethiopia
Rulers and heads of state of Ethiopia

 Goma
Gibe Goma